The 1978 United States Senate election in West Virginia took place on November 7, 1978. Incumbent Democratic U.S. Senator Jennings Randolph was re-elected to fourth term in office, narrowly defeating Republican Arch Moore, a former Governor. Despite his defeat, Moore's daughter, Shelley Moore Capito, would later win election to this seat in 2014, becoming the first female Senator from the state.

Democratic primary

Candidates 
 Jennings Randolph, incumbent U.S. Senator
 Sharon Rogers

Results

Republican primary

Candidates 
 Donald G. Michels
 Arch Moore, former Governor of West Virginia

Results

General election

Results

See also 
 1978 United States Senate elections

References 

West Virginia
1978
1978 West Virginia elections